Lake Manitou is a lake located in the unorganized territory of Lac-Jérôme, in the Minganie Regional County Municipality, in the Côte-Nord, in the province of Quebec, Canada. The Manitou River flows through the lake from north to south, and continues to the Gulf of Saint Lawrence.

Location

It is one of three large lakes on the Manitou River, the others being Aigle Lake in the north and Eudist Lake in the south.
It is accessible only by float plane.

Environment

A map of the ecological regions of Quebec shows the lake is in sub-region 6j-S of the east spruce/moss subdomain.

Fish

The Pourvoirie Mabec provides outfitting services for fishing and hunting on and around the lake.
The Pourvoirie Mabec has exclusive rights.
A survey of the Innu population of Mingan in 2007 reported that many of them practiced both ice fishing and summer fishing on the lake.

Notes

Sources

Lakes of Côte-Nord
Minganie Regional County Municipality